Near Orbit is a 1989 role-playing game supplement published by R. Talsorian Games for Cyberpunk.

Contents
Near Orbit expands the game to include zero-G adventuring, from geosynchronous orbit to the surface of the moon, which is the farthest humanity has spread.

Reception
Near Orbit was reviewed in Space Gamer/Fantasy Gamer No. 88. The reviewer commented that "Overall, the strengths of the supplement far outweigh the weaknesses. To my knowledge, this is the first hard science system set in outer space. It does not rely on aliens or 'the Force'; explosive decompression is exciting enough thank you. The technical background and ideas herein would be a worthy addition to any modern role-playing system, say James Bond or Top Secret."

References

Cyberpunk (role-playing game) supplements
Role-playing game supplements introduced in 1989